Udit Narayan  is a playback singer who works in Bollywood and whose songs have been featured mainly in Hindi language, Nepali, Telugu and Kannada language movies. He has won three National Film Awards and five Filmfare Awards. He is the only male singer in the history of the Filmfare Awards to have won over three decades (winning in the 1980s, 1990s, and 2000s). As many as 21 of his tracks feature in BBC's "Top 40 Bollywood Soundtracks of all time".

Kannada film songs

Tamil film songs

Telugu film songs

Bhojpuri film songs

Maithili songs

Nepali songs

Selected Nepali discography

Bengali songs

Malayalam film songs

Odia film songs

Odia album songs

Assamese songs

Film songs

Non-film songs

Rajasthani film Songs

See also
 List of songs recorded by Udit Narayan
 Bollywood selected discography of Udit Narayan

References

Non-Hindi songs
Narayan, non-Hindi songs